Su Dongshui (1931/2 – June 13, 2021), chief professor of Fudan University, Shanghai, China, and the chair of IFSAM 9th world conference (2008), Shanghai, China, was the founder of the oriental management school. Oriental management is a new research branch in the world academia of management science. As an experienced scholar, Su was engaged in the teaching and scientific studies in Shanghai Academy of Social Sciences, Shanghai University of Finance Economics and Fudan University successively, after his graduation from Xiamen University in 1953. During his more than 50 years of teaching career, he brought up more than 200 masters, over 80 doctors and 40 post-doctors. Many of his students have become leaders of governments, colleges or universities and enterprises.

Works
 Oriental Management, Shanghai: Fudan University Press, China, 2005
 Applied Economics, Shanghai: Oriental Publishing Center, China, 2005
 Chinese Management, Shanghai: Fudan University Press, China, 2006
 Management, Shanghai: Oriental Publishing Center, China, 2001
 Industry Economics, Beijing: Higher Education Press, China, 2000

References

External links
 http://www.ifsam.org.cn/index.asp?lang=1
 http://www.IFSAM.org/

1930s births
2021 deaths
People's Republic of China economists
Academic staff of Shanghai University of Finance and Economics
Academic staff of Fudan University
Year of birth missing
People's Republic of China writers